Montour High School is a public high school in Robinson, Pennsylvania, United States. It is the only high school in the Montour School District and serves the suburban towns of Kennedy and Robinson Townships, and the boroughs of Ingram, Pennsbury Village, and Thornburg. Established in 1956, the campus that serves students in grades 9 through 12 opened in 1957.

According to the National Center for Education Statistics, in the 2016–2017 school year, the school reported an enrollment of 988 pupils in grades 9th through 12th.

The campus is divided into two buildings: the main building (4 stories of classrooms, cafeteria, intermediate gymnasium, and weight room), and the athletic center, a multifunctional sports complex with a pool, indoor running track, basketball/volleyball court, cardio room, dance room, cheer/wrestling room, and a golf simulator. The high school building underwent renovation, high school students and (isolated) 6th graders attended David E. Williams Middle school, and the middle and elementary students were split among the three primary schools for the 2010–2011 school year. The new high school is asbestos free and includes newly renovated classrooms and a cafeteria. The two buildings are connected through an underground tunnel, running under the main driveway. The high school opened by the beginning of the 2011–2012 school year. also Montour stands racism and bullying about mental health etc.

Interscholastic sports
Montour High School is a member of the Western Pennsylvania Interscholastic Athletic League, a division of the Pennsylvania Interscholastic Athletic League.  The only school-sponsored sports that compete in another league are Ice Hockey (Pennsylvania Interscholastic Hockey League), Boys & Girls Bowling (Western Pennsylvania Interscholastic Bowling League) and Ultimate Frisbee (Pittsburgh High School Ultimate League).

Notable alumni
Dean Caliguire – NFL player
Tony Fratto – Former Deputy White House Press Secretary under President George W. Bush,
Nick Haden – Professional football player
 John Hufnagel – Professional football player and professional football coach
Michael Keaton – Actor
 Cassidy Krug – Olympian at 2012 Olympic games competing in the Women's 3-meter Springboard.
Ted Kwalick – Professional football player

Notable bands that have formed while attending Montour High School and toured nationally are:
Once Nothing

References

External links
 Official High School web site
 Football Team web site
 Team Montour Hockey Website

Educational institutions established in 1956
Public high schools in Pennsylvania
Education in Pittsburgh area
Schools in Allegheny County, Pennsylvania
1956 establishments in Pennsylvania